Dioryctria rubella, the pine shoot moth, is a species of snout moth in the genus Dioryctria. It was described by George Hampson in 1891 and is known from south-east Asia, including China and the Philippines.

The larvae have been recorded feeding on Pinus kesiya, Pinus merkusii, Pinus caribaea, Pinus taeda and Pinus massoniana. They generally tunnel and feed inside the shoots of their host plant. But also damage the branches and young cones.

References

Moths described in 1891
rubella